The National Anti-Doping Agency of India is India's national organisation responsible for promoting, coordinating, and monitoring the doping control program in sports in all its forms. 

As listed on its official web portal, the agency deals with adopting and implementing anti-doping rules and policies which conform with the World Anti-Doping Agency, cooperates with other anti-doping organisations and promotes anti-doping research and education.

The agency is formed by the Union Government under the societies Registration Act and includes scientists and representatives from the Indian Olympic Association.

References

Anti-doping organizations
Sports organisations of India
Drug policy of India